Justicia is a ward (barrio) of Madrid belonging to the district of Centro.

It contains the neighborhoods of Chueca and Salesas.

Wards of Madrid
Centro (Madrid)